A quantum bus is a device which can be used to store or transfer information between independent qubits in a quantum computer, or combine two qubits into a superposition. It is the quantum analog of a classical bus.

There are several physical systems that can be used to realize a quantum bus, including trapped ions, photons, and superconducting qubits. Trapped ions, for example, can use the quantized motion of ions (phonons) as a quantum bus, while photons can act as a carrier of quantum information by utilizing the increased interaction strength provided by cavity quantum electrodynamics. Circuit quantum electrodynamics, which uses superconducting qubits coupled to a microwave cavity on a chip, is another example of a quantum bus that has been successfully demonstrated in experiments.

History
The concept was first demonstrated by researchers at Yale University and the National Institute of Standards and Technology (NIST) in 2007. Prior to this experimental demonstration, the quantum bus had been described by scientists at NIST as one of the possible cornerstone building blocks in quantum computing architectures.

Mathematical description 
A quantum bus for superconducting qubits can be built with a resonance cavity.

References 

Quantum information science
Quantum electronics